Supernova were a Chilean pop band integrated by three girls and was created by Koko Stambuk and Cristian Heyne, influenced by American teen pop of the 90s.

Between 1999 and 2001, Supernova was integrated by Constanza "Coni" Lewin, Elisa Montes and Consuelo "Chi-K" Edwards, and from 2001 to 2003 by Claudia González, Constanza "Koni" Lüer and Sabina Odone. Both groups of girls only recorded one studio album each, the first one was Supernova which sold 45,000 copies, and achieved Double Platinum, and the second was Retráctate which was a Latin Grammy nominee for Best Pop Vocal Album, Duo or Group.

Several times the original group performed live on Blondie Discothèque and in 2010 the group returned for a mini tour.

Discography

Albums
Supernova (1999)
Retráctate (2002)

Singles

References

Chilean pop music groups